Surrey Bend Regional Park is an 860-acre park in Surrey, British Columbia. It's located along the Fraser River and Parsons Channel, and most of its area is a floodplain. The wetlands are home to many different species of wildlife, including birds and fish. There are 4 kilometres of multi use trails, picnic areas, and interpretive exhibits.

References

Parks in Greater Vancouver
Parks in Surrey, British Columbia